John Hartwell Cocke II (or Jr.) (September 19, 1780 – June 24, 1866) was an American military officer, planter and businessman. During the War of 1812, Cocke was a brigadier general of the Virginia militia.

After his military service, he invested in the James River and Kanawha Company and helped Thomas Jefferson establish the University of Virginia. The family estate that Cocke built at Bremo Plantation is now a National Historic Landmark.

Biography

Early life and education
John Hartwell Cocke II was born on September 19, 1780, at the Mount Pleasant plantation in Surry County, Virginia. With the exception of his younger brother Robert Kennon Cocke, who died in 1790, John was the only son of eight children born to John Hartwell Cocke I and Elizabeth Kennon Cocke. Through an entirely paternal line Cocke was a direct descendant of English politician Henry Cocke. The elder Cocke had married Elizabeth Kennon, who grew up on her parents'  plantation named Mount Pleasant, in Chesterfield County, Virginia. He became a colonel in the American Revolution. The younger Cocke was orphaned by the age of twelve; he inherited his father's plantation and slaves, which he took over after coming of age.

At the age of fourteen, Cocke enrolled at The College of William & Mary in Williamsburg, Virginia, where he stayed at the home of Colonel Champion Travis. Cocke graduated as part of the class of 1798. Upon his twenty-first birthday in 1801, he legally inherited the Mount Pleasant plantation.

Marriage and family
Cocke married Anne Blaus (or Blaws) Barraud in Norfolk, Virginia, on December 25, 1802. Her father, Philip Barraud, was a physician who practiced medicine in Williamsburg, where Cocke had studied. Anne stayed in Norfolk until March 1803, while Cocke renovated the plantation home in Surry County. The Cockes had a son, John Hartwell, in 1804 and a daughter, Louisiana Barraud, in 1806 at Mount Pleasant.

In 1809, Cocke sold the plantation to his sister Sally and her husband Nicholas Faulcon.  He moved with his family to Bremo Plantation, which he had built on the northern bank of the James River in Fluvanna County in the Piedmont. His wife gave birth at Bremo to another son, Philip St. George, in 1809 and another daughter, Ann Blaus, in 1811.

War of 1812

During the War of 1812, Cocke was commissioned as a brigadier general in command of the Virginia militia based out of Camp Carter and Camp Holly. His brigade was composed of companies of troops from Fluvanna County. From 1812 to 1813, Cocke led the defense of Richmond, Virginia along the Chickahominy River against British forces.

Cocke was noted for being a distinguished officer; the strict discipline he enforced upon insubordinate soldiers was compared to that of Baron von Steuben. Cocke rode a bay stallion named Roebuck during the war.

Post-war life

After the war, Cocke returned to his estate at Bremo, where his wife had another son, Cary Charles, born in 1814. Cocke's wife Anne died in December 1816, a few months after the birth of their youngest daughter, Sally Faulcon. Anne was buried at Bremo Recess.

In 1819, Cocke completed construction of a large plantation mansion at Upper Bremo with the master builder John Neilson, who had worked with Thomas Jefferson on Monticello. That year, Cocke was appointed by Virginia governor James Patton Preston to the first Board of Visitors of the University of Virginia. By the time Cocke retired from the board in 1852, annual enrollment at the university had reached 400 students.

In 1835, Cocke joined the board of directors of the James River and Kanawha Company, which was established to develop canals to improve water transportation along  of the James River. The river traffic became an important part of the local economy in the following decades, but a series of floods and the American Civil War brought an end to this era.

A devout Christian, Cocke participated in several efforts to reform different aspects of society, including temperance and gradual emancipation. Cocke inherited a number of slaves and also was an important player in Virginia's domestic slave trade, helping professors at the University of Virginia buy slaves and renting slaves to the institution. Cocke expressed "continual hostility to slavery" and promoted using "education and skill training" to prepare slaves for freedom and colonization in Africa; as a result, he was once violently attacked by a pro-slavery neighbor. By 1848, Cocke started a second plantation in Alabama as a place for slaves to prepare to colonize Liberia. Though it was unpopular with abolitionists and the black population in general in the United States, he supported the colonization project by sending books and supplies over the years. In 1855, Cocke traded his mansion for the smaller home of his son Cary Charles on the plantation, where he retired for the remainder of his years.

Legacy

John Hartwell Cocke's son Philip St. George Cocke was commissioned as a colonel in the Confederate States Army, commanding troops at the Battle of Blackburn's Ford and the First Battle of Bull Run. Promoted to brigadier general in 1861, he committed suicide that year before Christmas. He was described as "excitable" and "eccentric," but no one really understood what made him take such action.

In 1881, John's last surviving son, Dr. Cary Charles Cocke, along with William Cocke and Charles E. Cosby, purchased land nearby in Bremo Bluff to relocate a chapel which John Hartwell Cocke had built for his slaves on the plantation. Consecrated as part of an Episcopal Church, the Bremo Slave Chapel was listed on the Virginia Landmarks Register in December 1979 and the National Register of Historic Places in March 1980. 
Cocke's plantation was declared a National Historic Landmark as Bremo Historic District in November 1971.  He also designed Glen Burnie near Palmyra, Virginia and it was listed on the National Register of Historic Places in 2000.

Collaboration with Thomas Jefferson

Cocke was a longtime associate of former president Thomas Jefferson, and he sometimes traded for items grown at Jefferson's Monticello estate. Cocke collaborated with James Madison, James Monroe, and Joseph Carrington Cabell to fulfill Jefferson's dream to establish the University of Virginia. Cocke and Jefferson were appointed to the building committee to supervise the construction of the new university. Cocke's conservative practicality occasionally clashed with Jefferson's creative aesthetics, such as his opposition to Jefferson's flat roof design, which he thought would compromise the durability of buildings for students.

Jefferson's trust in the younger man was shown by his arranging for Cocke to take over executorship of the will of Tadeusz Kościuszko, a Polish nobleman whom Jefferson had befriended during the American Revolutionary War. On a visit to the United States in 1798, Kościuszko entrusted his pension from the Army and other monies to his friend Jefferson, together with his will; he intended to have his American estate used to purchase the freedom of slaves, including Jefferson's own. After Kościuszko's death in 1817, Jefferson did not immediately act on this will, in part because of his advanced age (he would die in 1826) and in part because Kościuszko had written three subsequent wills, and had relatives and acquaintances claiming that they—not Jefferson—should control his estate. Jefferson attempted to have the complicated legal affair, with its accompanying financial liabilities, transferred to Cocke, knowing that Cocke was also an opponent of slavery. However, Cocke also refused the task. The case of the disputed wills went before the Supreme Court of the United States three times, and in 1852 the Court finally ruled that Kościuszko had revoked his earliest will in 1816, giving his estate to his Polish relatives. Historians have disagreed over the correctness of Jefferson's actions, with some critics arguing that he passed up an opportunity to free all his slaves, and others pointing out that "Kosciusko screwed up," since Jefferson knew that the will was "a litigation disaster waiting to happen."

Since the late twentieth century, Cocke's diaries have attracted the attention of historians because of his writing about Jefferson's slave mistress.  The long debate known as the Jefferson-Hemings controversy has related to whether the president had an intimate connection with his slave Sally Hemings and her children. Most historians now believe that Jefferson had a long relationship with Hemings and four surviving children by her. He freed all of them, two informally and two in his will. Cocke wrote of his knowledge that Jefferson had fathered children with his slave mistress. In keeping with the social demands for discretion among planters on such interracial liaisons, Cocke did not reveal his knowledge until years after Jefferson had died.
He wrote about the slave concubines:

See also

American Colonization Society
American Temperance Union

References

Further reading

External links

Fluvanna's John Hartwell Cocke at Cedar Creek Publishing
John Hartwell Cocke II at Mount Pleasant Plantation

John Hartwell Cocke's letters to Thomas Jefferson (May 3, 1819)

1780 births
1866 deaths
American militia generals
College of William & Mary alumni
Delegates to the Virginia Ratifying Convention
18th-century American politicians
People from Fluvanna County, Virginia
People from Surry County, Virginia
American militiamen in the War of 1812
University of Virginia people
American slave owners
American slave traders
Cocke family of Virginia